Milady de Winter, often referred to as simply Milady, is a fictional character in the novel The Three Musketeers (1844) by Alexandre Dumas, père, set in 1625 France. She is a spy for Cardinal Richelieu and is one of the dominant antagonists of the story. Her role in the first part of the book is to seduce the English prime minister, the duke of Buckingham, who is also the secret lover of Queen Anne of France. Hoping to blackmail the queen, Richelieu orders Milady to steal two diamonds from a set of matched studs given to Buckingham by the queen, which were a gift to her from her husband, King Louis XIII. Thwarted by d'Artagnan and the other musketeers, Milady's conflict with d'Artagnan carries much of the second half of the novel.

Character overview
She is described as being 22 years old, tall, fair-haired and uncommonly beautiful, with brilliant blue eyes and black lashes and brows, Milady possesses a voice that can seduce and bewitch. 

A capable and intelligent French spy who effortlessly can pass as a native Englishwoman, Milady's beautiful exterior hides a diabolically cunning, manipulative, ruthless and cruel interior; she is remorseless and unrepentant for her countless "misdeeds" and often described as appearing demonic and frighteningly ugly in the instant when she is thwarted in her aims. She is a classic example of a femme fatale.

Milady later is revealed to be the wife of Athos, originally the Comte de la Fère, one of the three musketeers of the novel's title.

Background
Like Athos, who sheds his true identity as the Comte de la Fère when he joins the musketeers, Milady goes by numerous aliases, so that her identity is concealed for a good part of the novel. Athos first knows her as an adolescent Anne de Breuil, but because she already was concealing a scandalous and criminal past at that time, it was probably not her real name.

As a young Benedictine nun of 16, she seduced the convent's trusting priest. Urging him to steal the church's sacred vessels to finance a new life in another part of the country, they fled together and quickly were apprehended. Milady then seduced the jailer's son and escaped, leaving behind her first lover to be branded for theft. The executioner who had to brand the priest happened to be his brother, and blaming Milady for leading his brother astray, tracked her down on his own and branded her on the shoulder with the same fleur-de-lis symbol, marking her as a convicted criminal. The priest in turn escaped, and the lovers fled to a small town, where they posed as a country curate and his sister.

The village where they lived was part of Athos's lands, and he became captivated both by her beauty and her intellect. As seigneur of the county, he could have seduced her or taken her by force, but despite the opposition of his family and her obscure origins, he married her, giving her his wealth and title, and raising her to the nobility. While the pair were hunting in the forest one day, Milady fell from her horse and fainted. Cutting away her clothes so she could breathe, Athos discovered the convict brand on her shoulder. Dishonored, and having the right to dispense justice on his estates, Athos immediately hanged her from a tree. His wife's "brother", who had married the pair, fled before any retribution could be taken; Athos believes he only pretended to be a curate for the purpose of getting his mistress married in a secure position. For most of the novel, Athos assumes his deceitful wife is dead by his own hand, not knowing she survived the hanging and that she and Milady are the same person. Because the Comte de la Fère effectively ceases to exist when he becomes Athos, Milady makes the same mistake in presuming her first husband is dead.

Active role in the novel
When d'Artagnan first spies Milady in Paris, she has married into English nobility some time previously by wedding Baron Sheffield, the younger brother of Lord de Winter. After she was made her husband's heir, he died violently and mysteriously within a matter of hours, leaving her a widow with a young child, who is Lord de Winter's only heir. Discovering that Milady is infatuated with Comte des Wardes, an equally infatuated d'Artagnan forges the count's reply to a love letter from Milady and arranges a nighttime rendezvous, where he impersonates des Wardes. During the assignation, Milady gives him, as des Wardes, a sapphire and diamond ring and swears to have d'Artagnan killed because he wounded the real des Wardes in a duel. She also reveals that she detests d'Artagnan for having spared her brother-in-law's life in another duel which lost her the income from her son's potential inheritance.

When d'Artagnan later reveals to Milady that the tryst has been with him, not des Wardes, she attempts to kill him. In the struggle, her nightgown is torn, revealing the fleur-de-lis brand. Knowing that her terrible secret has been revealed to her enemy, Milady becomes resolved that d'Artagnan must die. Her attempts to secure his assassination leads to her eventual downfall. D'Artagnan escapes and immediately reports to Athos that Milady has a brand on her shoulder identical to one he discovered on his wife's body. When Athos hears this and identifies the ring Milady gave to d'Artagnan as his mother's, the former Comte de la Fère realizes that his wife is not dead after all.

Milady tries many methods to murder d'Artagnan; while eavesdropping on a meeting between Richelieu and Milady, the musketeers hear that, in exchange for her assassination of Buckingham, Richelieu will undertake the task. Milady bargains with the cardinal and obtains a pardon that absolves her of future (unnamed) actions. It is not until Athos confronts her and forces her at pistol to relinquish the pardon that a horrified Milady realizes that the musketeer Athos is her first husband, the Comte de la Fère. Athos refrains from killing her, instead leaving her with no choice but to be escorted to England on her murderous mission, but without the cardinal's pardon.

The musketeers then warn Lord de Winter that not only has his sister-in-law made previous attempts on his life, but that her first husband is still alive, invalidating her marriage to his late brother. They also attempt to foil Milady's plot against Buckingham by having de Winter warn him. Upon arriving in England, Milady is arrested and imprisoned in a house by de Winter, who has suspected that she poisoned his younger brother. He chooses for her jailer a man he thinks will be impervious to her charms, the straitlaced Puritan John Felton. However, Milady manipulates Felton that she is actually a Puritan as well, and that Buckingham is persecuting her because she refused his advances. Felton has his own grievances against Buckingham, whom he blames for his lack of promotion in the army, and succumbs to her manipulation. He then proceeds to murder the duke (an actual historical event), but then is aghast to see Milady's ship sailing away without him. He later is hanged for the crime.

Returning to France, Milady murders d'Artagnan's lover, then flees. The musketeers and Lord de Winter hunt Milady and track her to Lille, where they try her among themselves for her numerous crimes, including the poisoning of de Winter's brother. Athos finally charges her with deceiving him, hiding the fact that she was a convicted criminal when he married her. Milady defies anyone to produce any proof that she ever was sentenced for a crime. To her horror, the executioner of Lille steps forward to reveal himself as the man who branded her.

When his priest brother escaped from jail to follow Milady, the executioner was condemned to serve his brother's sentence for him. On learning this later, the disgraced priest returned and surrendered himself, only to hang himself in his cell that same night. The executioner reveals that, rather than having schemed to marry her to a count, his brother was abandoned when Milady left him to marry Athos. (This seems to be at odds with Athos' earlier assertion that her "brother" married the pair.)

This final evidence condemns Milady to death, and she is beheaded by the executioner.

Aliases
As the true identity of the Comte de la Fère is concealed by the name Athos, Milady's true identity is hidden by various names throughout the novel:
Anne de Breuil (the name by which Athos knew Milady when he met her)
Comtesse de la Fère (the title Milady assumed when she married the Comte de la Fère, later known as Athos)
Milady de Winter (the general name Milady is referred to throughout the story) (a variation on the previous name; in some English translations, this is translated as Clarisse or Clarice)
Charlotte Backson (the fictional name Milady's brother-in-law, Lord de Winter, attempts to bestow upon her in his plan to banish her to the colonies)

Her son in the sequel
In the 1845 sequel Twenty Years After, Milady's son Mordaunt, now 23, takes her role as one of the chief antagonists. As twisted and as deceitful as his mother, he sets about avenging her death, posing as a monk and murdering the executioner of Lille while taking his confession. He also murders Lord de Winter, Milady's brother-in-law, who raised him after the death of his mother.

Mordaunt later becomes involved in the English Civil War and commits regicide, executing King Charles I, in spite of the efforts of d'Artagnan and the three former musketeers to prevent it. D'Artagnan and his friends later confront Mordaunt at Cromwell's London residence, but in the course of a duel, he escapes through a secret passage.

The musketeers and their menservants leave England by ship, but Mordaunt sneaks aboard and blows it up. As the survivors escape in a rowboat, Mordaunt pleads for them to help him aboard, accusing them of killing him as they killed his mother. With the exception of Athos, they contemptuously reject his appeals. Athos insists on saving him, but as he helps him into the boat, Mordaunt deliberately drags him back into the water where they struggle, and Mordaunt is killed.

Origin of the character

The character of Milady previously appeared in the Mémoires de M. d'Artagnan (1700), a historical novel by Gatien de Courtilz de Sandras, which Dumas discovered during his research for his history of Louis XIV. In Courtilz's novel (one of the literary sources for the more famous novel by Dumas), Milady is one of the exiled English Queen Henrietta Maria's ladies-in-waiting. Dumas changed Milady's background significantly; from another Courtilz novel (Mémoires de M. le Comte de Rochforte, 1687) Dumas partly derived the idea of the branded woman, which he applied to his version of Milady.

There appears to be a possible historical precedent for the character of Milady: The memoirs of François de La Rochefoucauld and Hubert de Brienne, Comte de Conflans as well as Volume I of Chroniques de l'Œil de Bœuf by Touchard-Lafosse describe Milady's antagonistic role in the diamond studs plot which Dumas reworked in The Three Musketeers. In La Rochefoucauld's volume, Milady is the Countess of Carlisle, in de Brienne's version she is Lady Clarick de Winter, and in Touchard-Lafosse's history she is Lady de Clarick. Milady - or rather, her historical/literary precursors - play relatively minor roles in Courtilz's novel and the other memoirs and pseudo-memoirs. While her theft of the diamond studs and other activities in the first half of The Three Musketeers are accounted for in the earlier works that Dumas borrowed, her machinations in the second half of the book are largely Dumas' invention.

Others think that the character of Milady de Winter may be based on Lucy Hay, Countess of Carlisle (née Percy; 1599 – 5 November 1660). François de La Rochefoucauld mentioned in his Memoirs an anecdote he was told by Marie de Rohan, in which Lucy Hay stole some diamond studs (a present of the king of France to Anne of Austria) the queen had given to George Villiers, 1st Duke of Buckingham from the duke as revenge because he had loved her before he loved the queen of France. The king of France then wanted to see the studs and somehow the queen was able to recover them. Alexandre Dumas later used this entire story, and therefore he probably based Milady de Winter on Lucy Carlisle in his 1844 novel The Three Musketeers.

In popular culture

Film and television
Actresses who have played Milady on screen include:

 Barbara La Marr in The Three Musketeers (1921)
 Dorothy Revier in The Iron Mask (1929)
 Margot Grahame in The Three Musketeers (1935)
 Binnie Barnes in The Three Musketeers (1939)
 Lana Turner in The Three Musketeers (1948)
 Mylène Demongeot in Les trois mousquetaires: Premiere époque-Les ferrets de la reine and Les trois mousquetaires: La vengeance de Milady  (aka “The Fighting Musketeers” and “The Vengeance of the Musketeers”) (both 1961)
 Faye Dunaway in The Three Musketeers (1973) and The Four Musketeers (1974)
 Karin Petersen in The Four Charlots Musketeers 1 and 2 (1974)
 Margarita Terekhova in D'Artagnan and Three Musketeers (1978 miniseries)
 Rebecca De Mornay in The Three Musketeers (1993)
 Pia Douwes in 3 Musketiers (2003 musical)
 Emmanuelle Béart in D'Artagnan et les trois mousquetaires (2005)
 Milla Jovovich in The Three Musketeers (2011)
 Maimie McCoy in The Musketeers (2014)
 Eva Green in The Three Musketeers (2023)

In the cartoon version Dogtanian and the Three Muskehounds, Milady (voice of Eiko Masuyama) is a female cat while most of the characters are dogs. With the exception of her real name (Countess de Winter), her origins never were revealed. It was hinted that 'only one man' knows of her past.

In the movie The Return of the Musketeers, Kim Cattrall plays Milady's daughter Justine de Winter as a female version of Mordaunt.

Theatre
Milady de Winter has been portrayed in theatre plays by different actresses:

 Magali Noël in Les Trois Mousquetaires, directed by Michel Berto, Théâtre du Midi, 1971
 Natacha Amal in Milady by Éric-Emmanuel Schmitt from Les Trois Mousquetaires by Alexandre Dumas, directed by Pascal Racan, Villers Abbey, 2010
 Eunice Woods originated the role of Milady in The Three Musketeers by Kirsten Childs, The Acting Company 2022-2023 National Tour

Video games
Milady appears in the Japanese game Persona 5 as the persona of Haru Okumura.

References

Adventure film characters
Characters in The Three Musketeers
Fictional Christian nuns
Female characters in literature
Female film villains
Fictional French people
Female literary villains
Fictional lords and ladies
Fictional secret agents and spies
Literary characters introduced in 1844
Henrietta Maria
Fictional people from the 17th-century
Cardinal Richelieu